Haroldiataenius is a genus of aphodiine dung beetles in the family Scarabaeidae. There are about nine described species in Haroldiataenius.

Species
These nine species belong to the genus Haroldiataenius:
 Haroldiataenius buvexus Stebnicka & Skelley, 2009
 Haroldiataenius convexus (Robinson, 1940)
 Haroldiataenius griffini (Cartwright, 1974)
 Haroldiataenius hintoni (Saylor, 1933)
 Haroldiataenius limbatus (Bates, 1887)
 Haroldiataenius lucanus (Horn, 1871)
 Haroldiataenius mariarum (Bates, 1887)
 Haroldiataenius saramari (Cartwright, 1939)
 Haroldiataenius semipilosus (Van Dyke, 1928)

References

Further reading

 
 
 

Scarabaeidae
Articles created by Qbugbot